Salers is a commune of the Cantal département in France.

Salers may also refer to:
Salers (cattle)
Salers cheese

See also
Saler, a village in the Shamkir Rayon of Azerbaijan